Arkéa–Samsic is a UCI WorldTeam cycling team based in Rennes, France. After the team won enough points during the 2020–2022 seasons, the team was promoted from its prior status as a UCI ProTeam and now has automatic entry into all UCI World Tour races. Prior to 2023, the team participated in UCI Continental Circuits races and UCI World Tour races when receiving a wild card. The team was founded in 2005.

History
In 2014 they received a wildcard invitation to the 2014 Tour de France. In September, of the same year, the team announced they had formed a partnership with the amateur cycling team Brest Iroise Cyclisme 2000 (BIC 2000) to act as its reserve team. The team took part in the 2015 Tour de France and again in 2016, having been selected as a wildcard once again.

For 2016 and 2017 the team was named Fortuneo Vital Concept. On 1 June 2017 Vital Concept announced that it would cease sponsorship after 30 June. Oscaro stepped in as naming sponsor and the team became known as Fortuneo–Oscaro from 1 July. For the 2018 season onwards, the team signed the WorldTour rider Warren Barguil and built the team around him. The team is running under the name of Arkéa–Samsic starting with the 2019 season. For the 2020 season, the team signed former Movistar rider Nairo Quintana.

The team launched a women's team in 2020.

Incidents
After the 2020 edition of the Tour de France, it was announced that an investigation into Arkéa-Samsic had been started due to suspected doping. French prosecutors said there was a "discovery of many health products including drugs (...) and especially a method that could be qualified as doping."

Team roster

Major wins

National champions
2009
 France Road Race Championship, Dimitri Champion
2019
 France Road Race Championship, Warren Barguil

References

External links

 
UCI Professional Continental teams
Cycling teams based in France
Cycling teams established in 2005
Sport in Rennes